Robyn Kemp, known by her stage name Robyn Cage, is an American singer, songwriter, pianist and actress from Park City, Utah.

Career 

Before becoming a musician Cage trained in classical piano earning her BFA in Musical Theater from Boston Conservatory at Berklee.  After graduation Cage worked as an actress in New York City for five years appearing in the Hallmark Channel film  My Christmas Love (2016) and her performances earned praise from The New York Times and Variety (magazine).

Robyn moved backed to Utah, changed her last name from Kemp to Cage, and worked with two time Grammy-nominated producer Darryl Neudorf and Grammy-nominated and Juno Award-winning producer Dan Burns on her debut album, Born in the Desert released in October 2015.  The album was named one of the 35 Top Albums of 2015 by I’m Music Magazine and topped the list of 25 Best New Music Critiques of 2015 by Music Connection Magazine.

On February 16, 2018 Cage released her second album, Slow the Devil, which was named Best Indie Album of 2018 by Scorpius Magazine.

Cage has performed at Boston's Symphony Hall and the  Utah Music Awards. Her music has received exclusive video premieres on Baeble Music, GroundSounds, Live in Limbo and placements in MTV Italia's 16 and Pregnant, and feature film Hello, I Love You.

Discography

Studio albums

Singles

Remixes

Extended plays

Music videos

References 

American women singer-songwriters
People from Park City, Utah
Living people
21st-century American pianists
21st-century American women pianists
Year of birth missing (living people)
20th-century American singers
21st-century American singers
Boston Conservatory at Berklee alumni
20th-century American women
Singer-songwriters from Utah